The 1976 Los Angeles Rams season was the team's 39th year with the National Football League and the 31st season in Los Angeles. The Rams continued their dominance of the NFC West, winning their 4th straight division title as well as their 4th straight playoff berth. After a record setting 1975 season in which their defense was nearly untouchable, the Rams were picked by many to win the Super Bowl. Despite not improving on its 12-2 record from 1975, the team continued to be one of the best in the NFL. This Rams team is quite notable for setting many records during the season. One good notable record was breaking the franchise record for points scored in a game with 59 in a 59-0 winning against the Atlanta Falcons. The Rams would ultimately have another year of success, finishing 10-3-1. In the playoffs, they would beat Dallas 14-12 in the Divisional Round of the playoffs. However, the Rams would lose the NFC Championship game to the Minnesota Vikings 24-13.

Offseason

NFL Draft

Roster

Regular season

Schedule

Playoffs

Standings

References 

Los Angeles Rams
Los Angeles Rams seasons
NFC West championship seasons
Los Angeles Rams